Karl Jan Aas (25 August 1899 – 1 September 1943) was a Norwegian gymnast who competed in the 1920 Summer Olympics.

He was part of the Norwegian men's gymnastics team which won the silver medal in the gymnastics free system event. He represented the club Trondhjems TF.

References

External links
 

1899 births
1943 deaths
Sportspeople from Trondheim
Norwegian male artistic gymnasts
Gymnasts at the 1920 Summer Olympics
Olympic gymnasts of Norway
Olympic silver medalists for Norway
Olympic medalists in gymnastics
Medalists at the 1920 Summer Olympics
20th-century Norwegian people